Patrick Joseph Lynch (24 May 1867 – 15 January 1944) was an Australian politician who served as a Senator for Western Australia from 1907 to 1938. He was President of the Senate from 1932 to 1938. He began his career in the Australian Labor Party (ALP), but after the party split of 1916 joined the Nationalist Party and later the United Australia Party (UAP).

Early life
Lynch was born in Skearke, County Meath, Ireland and educated at Cormeen National School and Bailieborough Model School, County Cavan. He migrated to Queensland in 1886 and cut railway sleepers near Charleville and then travelled to the Croydon goldfields. In 1888 he started to work on ships operating along the Australian coast and in the South Pacific, eventually qualifying as a marine engineer. He worked as an engineer on a sugar plantation in Fiji and then on the Kalgoorlie goldfields in Western Australia. He helped found and Goldfields and Engine-drivers' Association and was its general secretary from 1897 to 1904. He married Annie Cleary in 1901.

State politics
Lynch was a member of the Boulder Municipal District council from 1901 to 1904. He was elected unopposed for the Western Australian Legislative Assembly seat of Mount Leonora in 1904, representing the Australian Labor Party and became Minister for Works in the first Western Australian Labor government, led by Henry Daglish in June 1905, but it fell in August.

Federal politics

Lynch was elected to the Australian Senate in the 1906 elections  In 1916, he became the first chairman of the River Murray Commission. During World War I, he was the first Federal Labor parliamentarian to advocate conscription and along with Billy Hughes, stopped attending the parliamentary caucus of the party on 14 November 1916. Hughes appointed him Minister for Works and Railways in his National Labor Party ministry that day, but he lost this position in the 17 February 1917 ministry to make room for a former Commonwealth Liberal Party member. He  was expelled from the state branch of the Australian Labor Party in March 1917. He was President of the Senate from August 1932 to June 1938, but was beaten at the 1937 elections.

Final years
Lynch married Mary Brown in 1933 after being widowed two years earlier. He ran unsuccessfully for the state seat of Geraldton in 1939. He died at Mount Lawley in 1944, survived by his wife and two daughters and a son of his first marriage.

References

Further reading

Nationalist Party of Australia members of the Parliament of Australia
Australian Labor Party members of the Parliament of Australia
Members of the Western Australian Legislative Assembly
Presidents of the Australian Senate
Members of the Australian Senate
Members of the Australian Senate for Western Australia
1867 births
1944 deaths
Members of the Cabinet of Australia
National Labor Party members of the Parliament of Australia
United Australia Party members of the Parliament of Australia
20th-century Australian politicians